Stinkwort is the common name given to plants of several species:

 Datura stramonium L., family Solanaceae
 Dittrichia graveolens (L.) W. Greuter, genus Dittrichia (formerly Inula graveolens (L.) Desf, genus Inula), family Asteraceae
 Helleborus fœtidus L., family Ranunculaceae

See also 

 Stenchwort